Celebrity Big Brother 22, also known as Celebrity Big Brother: Eye of the Storm, was the twenty-second and final series of the British reality television series Celebrity Big Brother. It launched on 16 August 2018 on Channel 5 and ended after 26 days on 10 September 2018. It was the fifteenth celebrity series and twenty-second series of Big Brother overall to air on Channel 5. For the first time since 2011, the celebrity edition aired before the main series with Big Brother 19 launching after the final in September 2018. Celebrity Big Brother 22 was the final celebrity series in the three-year contract which was announced on 19 March 2015. Emma Willis returned as host of the series, while Rylan Clark-Neal continued to present Celebrity Big Brother's Bit on the Side.

On 10 September 2018, Ryan Thomas was announced as the winner of the series, with Kirstie Alley as the runner-up.

On 14 September 2018, it was confirmed that this was the final series of Celebrity Big Brother to air on Channel 5 after their decision to axe the show.

Production

Eye logo
The official logo was released on 18 July 2018 (18 years after the first episode of Big Brother aired on Channel 4) and featured an eye consisting of neon lights including lightning bolts coming out of a stormy background.

Creative team
Endemol confirmed that a new creative team had been formed ahead of the series. Paul Osborne, executive producer of Big Brother 7, returned to overlook the new series as creative director. Tamsin Dodgson was also announced to return as Executive Editor. Trevor Boris was also later hired as a senior producer after co-producing Big Brother Canada since its inception.

House
On 15 August 2018, the official house pictures were released. The house is inspired by Californian design, and has been dubbed "a house within a house". The technical layout of the building has also undergone a revamp since the previous series, and the entry staircase has been closed-off for the first time since Channel 5 took over the Big Brother format, in order to "keep the outside out" according to the creative director Paul Osbourne.

There is also an outdoor lounge at the bottom of the garden, similar to the one in Big Brother 10, compared to Channel 5's usual choice to incorporate the lounge within the main living area.
The new living area has a large circular dining table at the centre, with a kitchen counter at one side. There is a leaf-print decor, complemented by palm-style plants and additional seating.

There is one bedroom, located behind the kitchen, with the palm theme continued with blue beds and pink accents. Adjoined to the sleeping quarters is the spare bathroom, which features a roll-top bath and vanity table.
In the garden, the snug has been replaced by a "pool room", a plush pink haven where the housemates can relax on padded loungers. The nearby sliding doors open up onto a dual swimming pool and hot tub deck, with which a mini cocktail bar is nearby.

Stormy Daniels
In the months prior to the live launch, there was wide speculation that adult film star Stormy Daniels would enter the house. Despite the reports, she did not enter the house on launch night.

A Big Brother statement issued the following day read: "Stormy Daniels was booked to appear on the show several months ago and hours before the show was due to go live, informed the production team that she no longer wished to enter the house as previously agreed. Producers discussed a variety of options with her but were unable to agree any acceptable conditions for her entering the house. Our focus is now on making a brilliant series with our fantastic celebrities."

Daniels said she offered to appear on the show during the live launch to explain her absence, but was turned down by producers. She also said an interview on Loose Women where she was due to explain her side of the story was blocked by Channel 5.

On the 17 August edition of Bit on the Side, Clark-Neal explained that just five hours before the first live show, Daniels said she only wanted to appear on launch night and then leave. Big Brother tried to agree to a compromise, but nothing came of it. Clark-Neal also insisted that money was not a factor and there was no attempt from producers to try to manipulate Daniels to achieve a specific outcome.

Housemates
On Day 1, thirteen housemates entered the house during the launch.

Ben Jardine
Ben Jardine is a British reality television personality and millionaire property tycoon, best known for his appearance on Channel 4's reality show Married at First Sight in 2017. He entered the house on Day 1. He was the third housemate to be evicted on Day 16.

Chloe Ayling
Chloe Ayling is an English glamour model, best known for her abduction in Italy in 2017 by an individual claiming to be a member of a criminal organisation called the Black Death Group. During her ordeal she was injected with ketamine, put in a holdall bag and put in the trunk of a car to be taken to a farm. She was released after six days. She entered the house on Day 1. She became the second housemate to be evicted on Day 13.

Dan Osborne
Dan Osborne is an English reality television personality, best known for starring in the ITVBe semi-reality programme The Only Way Is Essex from the eighth series in 2013. He was axed from the show during the fourteenth series when a threatening video he made surfaced online. He participated on the second series of Splash! (with former housemates Keith Duffy, Danielle Lloyd and Gemma Collins) in 2014 and placed fourth. He is also the husband of former EastEnders actress Jacqueline Jossa. He entered the house on Day 1. He left the house on Day 26 in third place. Of the whole series, he was the only housemate to receive no nominations.

Gabby Allen
Gabby Allen is a British reality television personality and fitness instructor, best known for being a cast member in the third series of ITV2 dating reality show Love Island in 2017 (with former housemate Jonny Mitchell). She entered the house on Day 1. She left the house on Day 26 in sixth place.

Hardeep Singh Kohli
Hardeep Singh Kohli is a Scottish comedian and presenter. He entered the house on Day 1. He was the fifth housemate to be evicted on Day 23.

Jermaine Pennant
Jermaine Pennant is an English professional footballer. Starting his career at Notts County in 1998, he then went on to play for Arsenal, Liverpool and Stoke City. In 2005, Pennant gained notoriety after playing a football match with an electronic tag following his arrest for drink-driving. He entered the house on Day 1. He became the fourth housemate to be evicted on Day 19.

Kirstie Alley
Kirstie Alley was an American Emmy Award and Golden Globe winning actress, known for her role as Rebecca Howe in NBC sitcom Cheers between 1987 and 1993. As well as this, she has starred in films such as Star Trek II: The Wrath of Khan, Look Who's Talking and Drop Dead Gorgeous. She has also taken part in the American dance television series Dancing with the Stars for its twelfth and fifteenth all-star series. She entered the house on Day 1. She left the house on Day 26 after coming runner-up.

Natalie Nunn
Natalie Nunn is an American reality television personality, best known for her appearances in Oxygen's reality show Bad Girls Club on and off between 2009 and 2015. She entered the house on Day 1. She became the first housemate to be evicted on Day 9.

Nick Leeson
Nick Leeson is an English former derivatives broker, best known for his time at Barings Bank, the United Kingdom's oldest merchant bank. From 1992, Leeson made unauthorised speculative trades, where his actions led directly to the 1995 collapse of Barings Bank, for which he was sentenced to prison. He entered the house on Day 1. He left the house on Day 26 in fourth place.

Jessica Alves
Jessica Alves (known as Rodrigo Alves at the time of recording) is a Brazilian-born British media personality, best known for her body transformation and her plastic surgeries. Earlier in the year, she appeared as a guest in the fifteenth Italian series of Big Brother, Grande Fratello. She entered the house on Day 1. On Day 2, she received a formal and final warning for repeatedly using racist language the night before. She was removed from the house in the early hours of Day 10, following a “further incident”.

Roxanne Pallett
Roxanne Pallett is a British actress and singer, known for playing Jo Sugden in the ITV soap opera Emmerdale between 2005 and 2008. She participated on the fourth series of Dancing on Ice (with former housemates Melinda Messenger, Jeremy Edwards and Coleen Nolan) in 2009 and placed sixth. She entered the house on Day 1. On Day 17, Roxanne voluntarily left the house after making an allegation of physical abuse against fellow housemate Ryan Thomas that later turned out to be false.

Ryan Thomas
Ryan Thomas is a British actor, known for playing Jason Grimshaw in the ITV soap opera Coronation Street between 2000 and 2016. Since then he has appeared as Rafael Humphreys in Australian soap opera Neighbours, and took part in Celebrity Island with Bear Grylls in 2017. He is the brother of Emmerdale actor Adam Thomas, and Love Island contestant Scott Thomas. He entered the house on Day 1. On Day 26, it was announced that Ryan had won the series.

Sally Morgan
Sally Morgan is a British television and stage artist, who claims to have psychic abilities. She entered the house on Day 1. She left the house on Day 26 in fifth place.

Summary

Nominations table

Notes
 : On Day 5, Kirstie (as House President) was able to award immunity to one housemate of her choice. She chose Jermaine.
 : Following Chloe's eviction, viewers were given the power to nominate. A free poll on the Big Brother app allowed viewers to pick their favourite housemate. The two housemates with the fewest votes – Ben and Jermaine – were "nominated", and the remaining housemates were called to the diary room one-by-one to select which of the two housemates they would like to evict. After an initial tie of 4-4, Big Brother asked the housemates to vote again face-to-face by a show of hands. Nick switched his vote, and Ben was subsequently evicted on Day 16.
 : This week the housemates made one nomination, rather than two. Any housemate who received a nomination faced eviction.
 : For the final three days, the public were voting for who they wanted to win, rather than save.

Ratings
Official ratings are taken from BARB. From 27 August 2018, for the first time, catch-up service totals were added to the official ratings.

Controversy

Racist language
Ofcom received over 1,000 complaints following Jessica Alves saying "nigger" twice on the first night. When describing fellow housemate Dan Osborne he said that he was "too white for [her] taste", and she would prefer to have a "nigger boy". Jessica was given a formal and final warning by Big Brother regarding this incident, but Big Brother and Channel 5 were criticised by fans, with some of them questioning why she was not removed from the house immediately, using the example of Emily Parr's removal from the 2007 series to justify their reasons, and for the airing of the word on the highlights show. However, on Day 10, Jessica was removed from the house, after an unaired "further incident".

Roxanne Pallett's assault claim

Another controversy on the series came from Roxanne Pallett after she made a formal complaint that Ryan Thomas attacked her. While the footage showed Ryan "play fighting" with her through shadowboxing, she insisted that he punched her "like a boxer punches a bag" and told her housemates this version of events. She later slept in the spare bedroom after she claimed that she felt uncomfortable sleeping in the same room as him. Following the incident, Ryan was given a warning, but he insisted that he did it with "no malice". Roxanne continued to complain about him still being allowed in the house and later branded him a liar to her fellow housemates when he protested his innocence.

The incident was denounced by viewers as a deliberate attempt by Roxanne to destroy Ryan's reputation. Following this, 21 Emmerdale cast members criticised Roxanne for her behaviour, with Charley Webb branding her as "outrageous", as well as  Sammy Winward tweeting that it was "a long time coming". Kelvin Fletcher, who played her on-screen husband Andy Sugden in the soap said that the incident was "calculated and manipulative beyond belief" whilst also showing support for Ryan. Within four days, Ofcom received over 25,000 complaints, making this the most complained incident regarding any Big Brother show since the race row in 2007. Furthermore, a petition launched to get her removed from panto work scheduled for Christmas reached over 4,000 signatures within two days. In the early hours of Day 17, Roxanne decided to voluntarily leave the house. Two days after her departure, on 3 September 2018, she returned for an interview with Willis, which was shown during that night's eviction show, where she apologised, stating she had made a "horrible mistake" but also stated she wanted to be "forgiven" for her actions. This incident has been called "punchgate" by the press.

References

External links
 Official website 
 

2018 British television seasons
22